Baltia shawi, the Shaw's dwarf, is a small butterfly of the family Pieridae, that is, the yellows and whites. It is found at high altitudes in Central Asia.

Description

Male on upperside is pale white; base of wings irrorated with black scales. Forewing: costal margin very narrowly yellowish, costal and subcostal veins irrorated with black scales, a discocellular elongate oblique black spot; a narrowly sub-triangular short oblique pre-apical black bar, its apex downwards, and a series of inwardly triangular black spots on the termen, these narrow posteriorly and reach from the apex of wing to vein 1. Hindwing: uniform, the irroration (sprinkling) of black scales more extended than on the forewing.

Underside: forewing white; costa and apex irrorated with black scales, the costa and termen margined with a line of pinkish yellow; the black discocellular spot, the black pre-apical bar and terminal series of black spots much as on the upperside, but the last is ill-defined, somewhat diffuse at apex and does not descend below vein 3. Hindwing: white with a dull pinkish tinge all over; the whole surface irrorated with black scales that form a broad elongate patch on posterior half of the wing and an obscure curved macular discal band beyond the cell; discocellulars defined with black.

The female differs from the male as follows: Upperside: somewhat thickly irrorated all over with black scales. Forewing with the discocellular black spot and terminal series of inwardly-pointed triangular black spots as in the male, but the latter more complete, extends from apex to tornus, the spots are larger and there is no pre-apical bar, out a complete, outwardly dentate, curved discal black band that crosses the wing from costa to dorsum. Hindwing: the irroration of black scales very dense in a broad patch posteriorly, and so arranged as to form a curved macular discal band. Underside similar to that of the male, but on the forewing there is a complete terminal series of inwardly triangular black spots and a complete, outwardly dentate, curved discal black band; while on the hindwing the irroration of black scales is denser. In both sexes the antennae are white annulated (ringed) with black, the club black; head whitish; thorax and abdomen fuscous black; beneath: head and thorax fuscous black, abdomen prominently white.

Wingspan 34–50 mm.

See also
List of butterflies of India (Pieridae)

References

Pierini
Butterflies of Asia
Taxa named by Henry Walter Bates
Butterflies described in 1873